Ideals and Realities of Islam is a 1966 book by the Iranian philosopher Seyyed Hossein Nasr.

See also
 The Heart of Islam

References

Sources
 
 
 
 
 

Seyyed Hossein Nasr
Books about Islam